Pasar Rebo (literally Wednesday Market in Betawi) is a district (kecamatan) of East Jakarta, Indonesia. The boundaries of Pasar Rebo District are the Ciliwung to the west and north; and Bogor Raya Road and Cipinang River to the east. The city of Depok is located to the south of Pasar Rebo District. 

Geographically Pasar Rebo consists of dry lands and rice fields. It is the district with the third highest percentage of greenery in Jakarta (54.8%, highest percentage of greenery is in Cakung (68.1%) and Cilincing Districts (64.2%)).

Kelurahan (administrative village)
The District of Pasar Rebo is divided into five administrative villages (kelurahan): 
Pekayon - area code 13710
Kampung Gedong - area code 13760
Cijantung - area code 13770
Kampung Baru - area code 13780
Kalisari - area code 13790

References

Districts of Jakarta
East Jakarta